Anushka Shetty is an Indian actress who appears in Telugu and Tamil  films . She made her acting debut in Puri Jagannadh's 2005 Telugu film Super, and appeared in Mahanandi, released later the same year. The following year, she had four releases, the first being S. S. Rajamouli's Vikramarkudu, which helped her gain recognition, followed by Astram (a remake of the 1999 Hindi film Sarfarosh), the Sundar C.-directed Rendu, (which marked her debut in Tamil cinema), and a special appearance in AR Murugadoss' Telugu film Stalin. She had two releases in 2007: Lakshyam and Don. In 2008, she appeared in six films, including Okka Magaadu, Swagatam and Souryam. In 2009, Shetty played two roles in the fantasy Arundhati. She went on to win the Nandi Special Jury Award and the Filmfare Best Telugu Actress Award for this film. Her next release that year was Billa, a Telugu remake of the 2007 Tamil film of the same name. Her final release in 2009 was her second Tamil feature film, the masala film Vettaikaaran, where she appeared as a medical student.

Shetty had a string of releases in 2010. She portrayed a prostitute in Krish's Vedam, which won her the Filmfare Award for Best Telugu Actress. Despite critical acclaim, the film failed at the box office. None of her other releases in 2010 succeeded commercially, except for her sole Tamil release of the year, the masala Singam. The following year, Anushka had two releases, both in Tamil. She reprised her Vedam role in its remake Vaanam, then appeared as an advocate in the A. L. Vijay-directed Deiva Thirumagal, a loose adaptation of the American film I Am Sam (2001). The following year, she also had two releases: Thaandavam in Tamil, and Damarukam in Telugu. Her first release in 2013 was Suraj's Tamil masala Alex Pandian, a critical and commercial failure. This was followed by Mirchi in Telugu, Singam II (where she reprised her role from Singam), and Selvaraghavan's Tamil romantic fantasy Irandaam Ulagam where she played three distinct roles. Her sole release of 2014 was K. S. Ravikumar's Lingaa.

In 2015, Shetty appeared in Gautham Vasudev Menon's Yennai Arindhaal, followed by Rajamouli's Telugu-Tamil bilingual Baahubali: The Beginning, where she played a queen named Devasena. Her performance as Rudrama Devi, a monarch of the Kakatiya dynasty in the eponymous film won her the Filmfare Award for Best Telugu Actress. She then appeared in the Telugu romantic comedy Size Zero (filmed simultaneously in Tamil as Inji Iduppazhagi), in a role for which she gained  of weight. Her only roles in 2016 were cameos in Soggade Chinni Nayana and Oopiri (filmed in Tamil as Thozha). The following year, she appeared in Si3 (the third film in the Singam series), the semi-biographical Om Namo Venkatesaya, where she played a character inspired by Andal, and Rajamouli's Telugu-Tamil bilingual Baahubali 2: The Conclusion, where she reprised her role from its predecessor. Her only release in 2018 was the Telugu-Tamil bilingual Bhaagamathie.

Film

Music videos

See also 
 List of awards and nominations received by Anushka Shetty

Notes

References

External links 
 

Actress filmographies
Indian filmographies